Kim Yong-chol (born 1946) is a North Korean general and politician who currently serves as Vice Chairman of the Central Committee of the Workers' Party of Korea for South Korean affairs and head of the United Front Department. From February 2009 to January 2016 he was the director of the Reconnaissance General Bureau, the country's primary intelligence service. On 24 April 2019, Yonhap News Agency reported that North Korea has removed Kim Yong-chol from the head of the United Front Department.

Early life
Kim Yong-chol was born in 1946 in Ryanggang Province.

Career

In 1962 he served in the 15th Division, a civil police company guarding the Korean Demilitarized Zone. In 1968 he was appointed a liaison officer to the United Nations Command, Military Armistice Commission, Korea. In 1976, he was made a division commander of the Supreme Guard Command. In 1990 he was promoted to Major General and became deputy director of the Ministry of People's Armed Forces and director of the MPAF Reconnaissance Bureau. In 1998 he was elected as a deputy to the 10th Supreme People's Assembly and again in 2003 to the 11th.

In 2009, he was appointed director of the Reconnaissance General Bureau and Vice-Chief of the General Staff Department of the Korean People's Army. He was also elected as a deputy to the 12th Supreme People's Assembly. In 2010, he was promoted to Colonel-General and elected to the Central Military Commission of the Workers' Party of Korea and the 6th Central Committee of the Workers' Party of Korea. He was a member of the funeral committee of Jo Myong-rok. In 2011, he was a member of the funeral committee of Kim Jong-il.

In 2012 he was promoted to General. In 2014, he was elected as a deputy to the 13th Supreme People's Assembly and served on the funeral committee of Jon Pyong-ho.

In May 2016, he was elected to the 7th Central Committee of the Workers' Party of Korea. He was elected as a member of the Politburo of the Workers' Party of Korea, the Central Military Commission of the Workers' Party of Korea and as Vice-Chairman of the Workers' Party of Korea. He was appointed director of the United Front Department and served on the funeral committees of Kang Sok-ju and Ryu Mi-yong, and he was elected to the Presidium of the Supreme People's Assembly.

Kim was sent as part of North Korea's Olympic delegation to the closing ceremony of the 2018 Winter Olympics held on 24 February 2018. His presence was controversial, mostly due to allegations that Kim was responsible for orchestrating an attack on a South Korean naval ship in 2010 that killed 46 sailors. An article in the Hangook Ilbo warned that Kim's attendance could send "raging waves" throughout the Korean Peninsula, but the games closed without incident.

On 30 May 2018, Kim flew to New York City via China for talks with United States Secretary of State Mike Pompeo regarding the 2018 North Korea–United States summit. He was hosted at a residential facility of the US delegation to the United Nations for highly "private" conversations with US counterparts. He then traveled to the White House for talks with President Trump on 1 June. During this meeting, he delivered a letter to President Trump from Kim Jong-un. Because he is subject to US sanctions, the visit required a travel waiver.

On 24 April 2019, Yonhap News Agency reported that North Korea has removed Kim Yong-chol from the head of the United Front Department.

In July 2020, it was reported that Kim Yong-chol was mentioned in a Rodong Sinmun article in relation to North-South communications working with Kim Yo-jong. Also prior to the article on June 24, 2020, Kim Yong-chol condemned remarks by the South Korean defense minister when he called for "mutual efforts" to reduce tensions between the two Koreas.

Awards and honors 
A picture of Kim shows him wearing the ribbons to all decorations awarded to him.

References

North Korean generals
Living people
21st-century North Korean people
People from Ryanggang
1946 births
Date of birth missing (living people)
Members of the Supreme People's Assembly
Members of the 8th Politburo of the Workers' Party of Korea
Members of the 8th Central Committee of the Workers' Party of Korea
Vice Chairmen of the Workers' Party of Korea and its predecessors